Deep Down Happy is the debut studio album by English alternative rock band Sports Team. It was released on 5 June 2020 under Island Records, and was nominated for the Mercury Prize 2020.

Singles
On 12 June 2019, Sports Team released the first single "Here It Comes Again". The second single "Fishing" was released on 12 September 2019. On 19 November 2019, the third single "The Races" was released. On 18 February 2020, the band announced their new album – scheduled for the original release of 3 April 2020 – along with the fourth single "Here's The Thing".

Commercial performance
On 12 June 2020, the album ranked at No. 2 on the Official Charts Company's UK Albums Chart. Sports Team lost the Number 1 spot to Lady Gaga's "Chromatica". It gained No. 1 in Scotland

Tour
On 19 June 2020, the band announced a tour of the UK, scheduled for April 2021.

Critical reception

Deep Down Happy was met with "generally favourable" reviews from critics. At Metacritic, which assigns a weighted average rating out of 100 to reviews from mainstream publications, this release received an average score of 78, based on 11 reviews/. Aggregator Album of the Year gave the album 78 out of 100 from a critical consensus of 14 reviews.

Track listing

Charts

References

2020 debut albums
Island Records albums
Sports Team (band) albums
Albums produced by Burke Reid